Redmi Note 8, Redmi Note 8T and Redmi Note 8 Pro are Android-based smartphones as part of the Redmi Note series by Redmi, a sub-brand of Xiaomi Inc. They were released on 29 August 2019 in an event held in China. The Redmi Note 8 Pro is the first smartphone to be equipped with a 64-megapixel camera. The Note 8 Pro was released in Italy on 23 September 2019.

Specifications

Dimensions 
The Xiaomi Redmi Note 8 measures . For the Xiaomi Redmi Note 8, it measures . Both of them weighs . The curved back with a gloss finish and the front is made of Gorilla Glass 5, and the frame is made of plastic. The bezels, which are always painted in black, are small (except the chin at the bottom), however, the phone does wobble because of a camera bump raising the phone. It is also splash-proof and has a P2i water-repellent coating.

References

Phablets
Redmi smartphones
Mobile phones introduced in 2019
Mobile phones with multiple rear cameras
Mobile phones with 4K video recording
Mobile phones with infrared transmitter
Discontinued smartphones